ComedyMax is a former television channel in Turkey, which broadcasts worldwide hit TV series as Turkish subtitled. It is exclusively available for Digiturk satellite package subscribers.

List of comedy shows on ComedyMax
Some of the shows on ComedyMax:

2 Broke Girls
3rd Rock from the Sun
10 Things I Hate About You (TV series)
30 Rock
According to Jim
America's Funniest Home Videos
American Dad!
Andy Richter Controls the Universe
Becker
Big Day
Boy Meets World
Californication
Caroline in the City
Carpoolers
Cavemen
Center of the Universe
Chappelle's Show
Clueless
Comedy Central Presents
Committed
Complete Savages
Cosby
Chappelle's Show
Cougar Town
Courting Alex
Crumbs
Curb Your Enthusiasm
Dave's World
Dilbert
Dream On
Drew Carey Show
Ellen
Entourage
Everybody Hates Chris
Everybody Loves Raymond
For Your Love
Frasier
Freddie
Friends
Gary Unmarried
Greetings from Tucson
Grounded for Life
Home Improvement
Hope & Faith
I'm With Her
In Case of Emergency
In-Laws
Ink
It's All Relative 
Jake in Progress
Just Shoot Me!
Keen Eddie
King of the Hill
King of Queens
Kristin
Ladies Man
Late Night with David Letterman
Late Show with David Letterman
Less Than Perfect
Life on a Stick
Life with Bonnie
Love, Inc.
Lovespring International
Mad About You
Mad Love
Melissa & Joey
Men, Women & Dogs
Mike & Molly
Miss Guided
Modern Family
Moonlighting
My Big Fat Greek Life 
My Wife and Kids
Murphy Brown
NewsRadio
Notes From the Underbelly
Outnumbered
Out of Practice
Perfect Strangers
Puppets Who Kill
Psych
Raising Dad
Reaper
Reba
Rock Me Baby
Rodney
Roseanne
Rules of Engagement
Samantha Who?
Second Time Around
Sex and the City
She Spies
Slacker Cats
Son of the Beach
Sons & Daughters
Spin City
Still Standing
Suburgatory
Taxi
'Til Death
The Big Bang Theory
The Cosby Show
The Game
The Knights of Prosperity
The Middle
The Naked Truth
The Nanny
The Office
The Parkers
The Simpsons
The Thin Blue Line
The War at Home
Three Sisters
Two and a Half Men
Two Guys and a Girl
Ugly Betty
Watching Ellie
Weeds
What I Like About You
Who's the Boss
Will And Grace
Yes Dear

External links
Official site 
ComedyMax at LyngSat Address
Digiturk Channel ComedyMax

Defunct television channels in Turkey